Albert Irvin Cassell (1895–1969) was a prominent mid-twentieth-century African-American architect in Washington, D.C., whose work shaped many academic communities in the United States. He designed buildings for Howard University in Washington D.C., Morgan State University in Baltimore, and Virginia Union University in Richmond. Cassell also designed and built civic structures for the State of Maryland and the District of Columbia.

Early life
Albert Irvin Cassell was born in Towson, Maryland, on June 25, 1895, the third child of Albert Truman Cassell and Charlotte Cassell.
His father Albert T. Cassell was a coal truck driver and his mother Charlotte Cassell aka "Lottie" was a laundress.  Albert Cassell began his education in the segregated Baltimore public school system, but moved to New York in 1909 where he began attending Douglas High School. At Douglas High, Cassell studied drafting under Ralph Victor Cook.  With Cook's assistance, Cassell was admitted to the Cornell University architecture program in 1915, where he was a member of Alpha Phi Alpha.

After completing two years at Cornell, Cassell's studies were interrupted by service in the US Army in World War I.  He served in France, but not in combat, and was honorably discharged in 1919 as a second lieutenant in the 351st Heavy Field Artillery Regiment.  In 1919 Cassell was awarded his degree from Cornell University, and began his career working with architect William A. Hazel.  In 1920, Mr. Cassell joined in the Architecture Department of Howard University as assistant professor.  Just two years later, in 1922, Cassell had become University Architect and head of the Architecture Department at Howard.

Career
Cassell worked at Howard University for eighteen years, serving as an instructor, land manager, surveyor, and architect.  Cassell's vision and work helped shape the campus through his "Twenty Year Plan", through which he designed numerous campus buildings.  His most important design at Howard, was the Founders Library, a building which evoked both the Georgian architecture revival style and Independence Hall in Philadelphia.  This building would become an architectural and educational symbol for the university.

While at Howard, Cassell also designed buildings for other institutional clients.  His work included buildings at Virginia Union University, Provident Hospital in Baltimore, various Masonic temples, as well as smaller works for select commercial and residential clients.

Following his time at Howard University, Cassell went on to design several buildings for Morgan State College (now Morgan State University) in Baltimore.  In his later years he joined with other African-American architects to form the firm of Cassell, Gray & Sutton.  He went on to work for several other large clients such as the Roman Catholic Archdiocese of Washington and the government of the District of Columbia.

As his final project, Cassell sought to develop Chesapeake Heights on the Bay, a  summer resort community for African-Americans in Prince Frederick, Calvert County, Maryland.  The project was to feature houses, a motel, shopping centers, a pier, a marina, beaches, and a clubhouse fronting the Chesapeake Bay.  Roads and a few homes were built by 1969, but the project ended with Cassell's death in that same year.

Legacy
At a young age Albert Cassell determined that his children would all go to Cornell and all become architects. Cassell had 8 children. Four children would attended Cornell; Charles Cassell ('46), Martha Cassell ('47)  Alberta Jeannette Cassell ('48) Paula Cassell ('76). Of the Cornell graduates, all but Paula became architects.

Works

Two of Cassell's Washington, DC works, the Mayfair Mansions Apartments and the Prince Hall Masonic Temple, are listed on the U.S. National Register of Historic Places.

Gallery

References

 Wilson, Dreck Spurlock (ed.), African-American Architects : A Biographical Dictionary, 1865-1945. New York: Routledge, 2004.
 "Albert Cassell", Roper Library, Morgan State University Archives, manuscript collection.

External links

 Albert I. Cassell & The Founders Library: A Brief History (Howard University)
 Top 10 Afro-American Architects

1895 births
1969 deaths
20th-century American architects
Architects from Maryland
Cornell University College of Architecture, Art, and Planning alumni
African-American architects
People from Towson, Maryland
United States Army personnel of World War I
Howard University faculty
20th-century African-American artists